Quoth is a 1993 EP by Richard D. James released under the Polygon Window alias. It was released through Warp on 22 March 1993. The title track is included on the album Surfing on Sine Waves.

It peaked at number 49 on the UK Singles Chart. In 2017, Fact placed the title track at number 5 on the "50 best Aphex Twin tracks of all time" list.

Track listing

Personnel
Credits adapted from liner notes.
 Richard D. James – writing, production, arrangement, programming, engineering, location recording
 Samantha Robinson – photography
 The Designers Republic – design

Charts

References

External links
 

1993 EPs
Aphex Twin EPs
Warp (record label) EPs